Elections to East Lothian Council were held on 3 May 2007, the same day as the other Scottish local government elections and the Scottish Parliament general election.

The election was the first using seven new wards created as a result of the Local Governance (Scotland) Act 2004.  Each ward elected three or four councillors using the single transferable vote system of proportional representation. The wards replaced 23 single-member wards which used the plurality (first past the post) system of election.

The Labour majority administration was replaced by a coalition between the SNP and Liberal Democrats, led by the SNP's Paul Stewart McLennan.

Election results

Ward results

Changes after 2007
† Stuart Currie defected from the Liberal Democrats and joined the Scottish National Party on 11 August 2009
†† Ruth Currie defected from the Liberal Democrats and joined the Scottish National Party on 11 August 2009

2007 Scottish local elections
2007